Sai Wan is the name or part of the name of several places in Hong Kong.

 Sai Wan (西環) means Western District:
Sai Wan, Western District
 Sai Wan (西灣) means West bay:
Sai Wan, Cheung Chau
Sai Wan, Ma Wan
Sai Wan, Sai Kung
Sai Wan, Tai A Chau
Fan Lau Sai Wan
Kau Sai Wan

Sai Wan is also the former name of Chai Wan:
Sai Wan War Cemetery

See also
 Sai Wan Shan (disambiguation)
 Siu Sai Wan
 Sai Wan Ho

zh:西灣